Eastern Morocco Arabic, Eastern Moroccan Arabic or Oujda Darija is a dialectal continuum of Hilalian Arabic, mainly spoken in Oujda area and in a part of Oriental region of Morocco.

See also
 Moroccan Arabic

References

Arabic languages
Moroccan Arabic